Woman, Bird, Star (Homage to Pablo Picasso) is a 1966–1973 oil painting by Joan Miró, which since 1988 has been in the collection of the Museo Nacional Centro de Arte Reina Sofía in Madrid.

References

Paintings in the collection of the Museo Nacional Centro de Arte Reina Sofía
Surrealist paintings
1973 paintings
Paintings by Joan Miró
Birds in art